Mary Baine Campbell (born Hudson, Ohio) is an American poet, scholar, and professor.  She teaches medieval and Renaissance literature, as well as creative writing, at Brandeis University.

Awards
 1999 James Russell Lowell Prize, awarded to the best book of the year in literary studies, from the Modern Language Association, for Wonder and Science.
 2000 Susanne C. Glasscock Humanities Book Award
 1988 Barnard Women Poets Prize

Scholarship, research, and creative works

Poetry

Editor

References

External links
Campbell's faculty page at Brandeis.
Brandeis faculty guide, including photograph.

Brandeis University faculty
People from Hudson, Ohio
Living people
American women poets
Year of birth missing (living people)